Matthew Garrett is an Irish technologist, programmer, and free software activist who is a major contributor to a series of free software projects including Linux, GNOME, Debian, Ubuntu, and Red Hat. He has received the Free Software Award from the Free Software Foundation (FSF) for his work on Secure Boot, UEFI, and the Linux kernel.

Life and career 

Garrett states that he was born in Galway, Ireland and has a PhD in Genetics from the University of Cambridge. He is the author of several articles on Drosophila melanogaster (i.e., fruit fly) genetics.

Garrett has been a contributor to the GNOME and the Debian Linux projects, was an early contributor to Ubuntu, was an initial member of the Ubuntu Technical Board, worked as a contractor at Canonical Ltd., and worked at Red Hat.

At Canonical Ltd. and Red Hat, Garrett worked on power management in Linux. While at Red Hat, Garrett also worked on issues relating to Secure Boot and UEFI and the Linux kernel to preserve users' ability to run the operating system of their choosing on hardware supporting Secure Boot. This work eventually led to his being awarded the 2013 FSF Free Software Award.

Garrett worked at the cloud computing platform company CoreOS and is cited in the press as an expert in cloud computing issues. From 2017 until 2021, he worked for Google and is currently employed at Aurora.

He has received the Free Software Award from the Free Software Foundation for his work on Secure Boot, UEFI, and the Linux kernel.

Advocacy 

Garrett has been a strong advocate for software freedom and compliance with the GNU General Public License (GPL) in the Linux kernel. For example, Garrett filed a complaint with US Customs against Fusion Garage due to violations of the GPL.

In March 2021, Garrett, who had served on the Free Software Foundation's board of directors, signed an open letter to the FSF calling for the removal of its entire board and for Richard Stallman to be removed from all leadership positions.

References

External links 
 Garrett's blog on Dreamwidth

Alumni of the University of Cambridge
Irish computer programmers
Free software programmers
Linux kernel programmers
Living people
Open source people
People from Galway (city)
Debian people
Ubuntu (operating system) people
GNOME developers
Google employees
Year of birth missing (living people)